Pat Harrington (born 18 March 1929) is a former  Australian rules footballer who played with South Melbourne in the Victorian Football League (VFL).

Notes

External links 

Living people
1929 births
Australian rules footballers from Victoria (Australia)
Sydney Swans players
Coragulac Football Club players